Angels Landing is a proposed development complex in Downtown Los Angeles, California, consisting of two regular high-rise buildings.

At the southeast corner of the site is a portal for the Pershing Square station serving the Metro B Line (Red) and the Metro D Line (Purple). The site is next to Angels Flight and the adjacent public staircase, across the street from Grand Central Market and near Pershing Square. The  sloping site in the Bunker Hill neighborhood is owned by the City of Los Angeles. The site was the former Angels Knoll Park, made popular by the film 500 Days of Summer in 2009.

Design
The Angels Landing development currently consists of two towers with luxury hotels, residential units and a retail plaza.

The proposed complex is currently in the design/funding process. The tower was approved by the City Council December 2017. The developer plans to provide underground parking, as the site sits above a subway station.

The design within the two towers will include condominiums, market-rate rental units, two hotels and commercial space with open space and a connection to California Plaza.

See also
List of tallest buildings in Los Angeles

References

External links
 Angels Landing Partner LLC – angelslandingdtla.com
 Angels Landing - Handel Architects
 Angels Landing Project: Draft Environmental Impact Report Los Angeles City Planning - January 2021
 skyscrapercenter.com/building/angels-landing-tower

Buildings and structures in Downtown Los Angeles
Proposed buildings and structures in California